A by-election was held in the state electoral district of The Hills on 9 October 1976. The by-election was triggered by the resignation of Max Ruddock.

Dates

Result	

Max Ruddock resigned.

See also
Electoral results for the district of The Hills
List of New South Wales state by-elections

References

1976 elections in Australia
New South Wales state by-elections
1970s in New South Wales